Remember This is the second album released by American power pop band Artist vs. Poet, which was released on April 25, 2012.  It marks their first self-released album after being dropped by Fearless Records on December 7, 2011.

Track listing

Personnel 
 Joe Kirkland - Lead vocals, rhythm guitar, piano
 Jason Dean - Bass, drums
 Dylan Stevens - Lead guitar, backing vocals

Remember This (Anniversary Edition) 

Remember This (Anniversary Edition) is the reissue of the band Artist vs. Poet's acoustic album, Remember This, released on April 27, 2013.  It features full band versions of all eight original tracks, a full band version of their single, "The Remedy", and a newly recorded track, "Whiskey > Problems".

Track listing

References

External links 
 Artist vs. Poet on MySpace
 Artist vs. Poet on Fearless Records

2012 albums
Artist vs. Poet albums